Group B of the 2002 FIFA World Cup took place between 2 and 12 June 2002. Spain won the group and advanced to the second round along with Paraguay, who beat South Africa to finish in second place on goals scored. South Africa and Slovenia failed to advance.

Standings

Spain advanced to play Republic of Ireland (runner-up of Group E) in the round of 16.
Paraguay advanced to play Germany (winner of Group E) in the round of 16.

Matches
All times are local (UTC+9)

Paraguay vs South Africa

Spain vs Slovenia

Spain vs Paraguay

South Africa vs Slovenia

South Africa vs Spain

Slovenia vs Paraguay

External links
 Results

B
Spain at the 2002 FIFA World Cup
Group
South Africa at the 2002 FIFA World Cup
Paraguay at the 2002 FIFA World Cup